Jazira or Al-Jazira ( 'island'), or variants, may refer to:

Business
Jazeera Airways, an airlines company based in Kuwait

Locations
 Al-Jazira, a traditional region known today as Upper Mesopotamia or the smaller region of Cizre
 Al-Jazira (caliphal province), an Umayyad and Abbasid province encompassing Upper Mesopotamia in modern Syria, Iraq and Turkey.
 Al-Jazira Province, former Syrian province
 Jazira Region, an autonomous Syrian region
 al-jazīrah al-ʻarabīyah, the Arabian Peninsula
 Al Jazirah, Sharjah, United Arab Emirates
 Algeria (Berber: ⴷⵣⴰⵢⴻⵔ Dzayer from Arabic:  al-Jazā'ir) North Africa
 Algiers, the capital city of Algeria
 Al Jazirah (state), Sudan
 Gezira (Cairo), island in Egypt
 Gezir, town in Iran
 Algeciras, Spain
 Ciutadella de Menorca (Madina al Jazira), Minorca, Balearic Islands
 Alzira, Valencia, Spain 
 Lezíria do Tejo, Portugal
 Gżira, a town in Malta
 Cizre, Turkey
 Zalzala Koh or Zalzala Jazeera, Pakistan
 St. Martin's Island, Bangladesh
 Jazeera Beach, Somalia

Media
Al Jazeera, an Arabic global news television channel
Al Jazeera Media Network
Al Jazeera America, the network's American national news channel
Al Jazeera Balkans, the network's Balkans regional news channel
Al Jazeera English, the English language global news channel
Al Jazeera Türk, the network's defunct Turkish news website
Aljazeera Magazine, a defunct magazine published by Aljazeera Publishing
Aljazeera Publishing, defunct publisher of Aljazeera Magazine
Aljazeera.com, the former website of Aljazeera Magazine
 Al Jazirah (newspaper), a Saudi daily newspaper

Sports
Al Jazira Club, a sports team in Abu Dhabi, United Arab Emirates
Al-Jazeera (Jordan), a football club in Jordan
Al-Jazeera SC (Syria), a football club in Syria
Aljazeera Sports Club, a football club in Libya
Al Jazeera SC, a sports club located in Mersa Matruh, Egypt
Gezira Sporting Club, a sports club located in Cairo, Egypt
Gezira (basketball club), a basketball club located in Cairo, Egypt

Arabic words and phrases